Genuitec, LLC is a Texas-based privately held software company that creates tools for professional software developers. Genuitec's products include integrated development environment (IDE) for Enterprise Java (Jakarta EE), MyEclipse, and CodeTogether.

History
Genuitec was established in 2001. Genuitec was a founding board member of the Eclipse Foundation and operates as a globally distributed organization based in Flower Mound, Texas.

Products 
 MyEclipse – IDE for Enterprise Java and web development
 CodeTogether – Cross-IDE live sharing for VS Code, Eclipse, and JetBrains IDEs
 DevStyle with Darkest Dark Theme – The most popular theming system for Eclipse
 MobiOne – IDE for iOS development
 GapDebug – IDE for debugging PhoneGap and Cordova applications
 Secure Delivery Center – IDE configuration, management, and security system for Eclipse
 CodeMix – Web tools for the Eclipse IDE
 Angular IDE – Angular development tools for the Eclipse IDE

References

External Links 
Official Website
Software companies based in Texas
Companies based in Dallas
Software companies of the United States
1997 establishments in the United States
1997 establishments in Texas
Software companies established in 1997
Companies established in 1997